Post Fiji is the national post office of Fiji. The group was founded in 1871 by the Cakobau Postal Act.

See also
Postage stamps and postal history of Fiji

References

External links

Communications in Fiji
Philately of Fiji